"Nepenthaceae" is a monograph by Joseph Dalton Hooker on the tropical pitcher plants of the genus Nepenthes. It was published in 1873 in the seventeenth and final volume of Augustin Pyramus de Candolle's Prodromus Systematis Naturalis Regni Vegetabilis, which was edited by Augustin's son, Alphonse. The monograph focused primarily on new discoveries from northern Borneo. Unlike most major works on Nepenthes, it included no illustrations.

Content
Published only a year after Ernst Wunschmann's "Über die Gattung Nepenthes", Hooker's monograph expanded the number of known species considerably. Hooker recognised 33 species, including 7 described for the first time: N. bicalcarata, N. celebica (later synonymised with N. maxima), N. echinostoma (later reduced to a variety of N. mirabilis), N. hirsuta, N. khasiana, N. tentaculata, and N. vieillardii. Nepenthes blancoi and N. maxima were listed as "species non satis notæ" (little known species), while N. cristata was included under "species admodum dubia" (very doubtful species). Hooker also described 5 varieties: N. albomarginata var. villosa, N. boschiana var. lowii (later described as N. stenophylla), N. phyllamphora var. macrantha (later synonymised with N. mirabilis), N. rafflesiana var. glaberrima, and N. rafflesiana var. nivea. Most of these varieties are not considered to be of taxonomic value today. Hooker's concept of N. rafflesiana encompassed both N. rafflesiana and N. × hookeriana (the natural hybrid between N. ampullaria and N. rafflesiana).

The manuscript of Hooker's monograph formed the basis for an article by Maxwell T. Masters published in the April 20, 1872 issue of The Gardeners' Chronicle and Agricultural Gazette. A number of Hooker's names appeared there for the first time, including the two varieties of N. rafflesiana and one of N. albomarginata; the as yet undescribed N. khasiana was included under the spelling N. khasyana.

Species
The following taxa are covered in the monograph, with 33 recognised as valid species (including two little known ones).

 N. alata
 N. albomarginata
var. villosa
 N. ampullaria
 N. bicalcarata
 N. bongso
 N. boschiana
var. lowii
var. sumatrana
 N. celebica
 N. distillatoria
 N. echinostoma
 N. edwardsiana
 N. eustachya
 N. gracilis
 N. hirsuta
 N. kennedyana
 N. khasiana
 N. lowii
 N. madagascariensis
 N. melamphora
var. haematamphora
? var. lucida
 N. pervillei
 N. phyllamphora
var. macrantha
 N. rafflesiana
var. glaberrima
var. nivea
 N. rajah
 N. reinwardtiana
 N. sanguinea
 N. tentaculata
? var. "foliis basi longe decurrentibus"
 N. teysmanniana
 N. trichocarpa
var. erythrosticta
 N. veitchii
 N. ventricosa
 N. vieillardii
 N. villosa

Species non satis notæ
 N. blancoi
 N. maxima

Species admodum dubia
 N. cristata

Infrageneric classification

Hooker attempted the first infrageneric classification of the genus, dividing it into two sections. He placed N. pervillei in the monotypic Anourosperma, distinguishing it on the basis of its round seeds. All other species were subsumed in the second section, Eunepenthes. This classification would be expanded upon in the 1895 monograph of Günther Beck von Mannagetta und Lerchenau, "Die Gattung Nepenthes", and the 1936 work of Hermann Harms, "Nepenthaceae".

References

External links
 Digitized version at the Internet Archive

Nepenthes literature
1873 books